Ernest Elias Rogers (December 6, 1866 – January 28, 1945) was an American politician who was the 81st Lieutenant Governor of Connecticut from 1929 to 1931.

Along with Rogers' political pursuits, he was a member of the Sons of the American Revolution, serving as the organization's President General from 1927 until 1928 Rogers died of a heart attack during Sunday church service in 1945, aged 78. He was also a mayor of New London, Connecticut.

References

1866 births
1945 deaths
Lieutenant Governors of Connecticut
State treasurers of Connecticut
Sons of the American Revolution
Mayors of New London, Connecticut